Nikola Petrić (born 11 May 1991) is a Serbian football goalkeeper who plays for Napredak Kruševac.

Career

Borac Čačak
Born in Čačak, where he passed youth categories with local club Borac Čačak, Nikola made his first senior appearances with Mladost Lučani in the Serbian First League as a loaned player, during the first half of the 2010–11 season. After returning to Borac, Petrić was usually used as a backup option, without appearances until the last two matches of the 2011–12 Serbian SuperLiga season. Later, after the club got relegated to the Serbian First League, Petrić became the first choice. Petrić became a captain and continued keeping until the end of 2014, when he refused an offer to sign new deal with club. He spent the spring half of 2014–15 Serbian SuperLiga season without of team, and after the end of contract, he left the club in summer 2015.

Čukarički
In summer 2015, Petrić joined Čukarički as a free agent, and took jersey number 1, after Borivoje Ristić left the club. He spent the whole 2015–16 season as a reserve for Nemanja Stevanović and later he started next season at the same position, but after Stevanović left to Partizan, Petrić made his debut for club in second fixture of the 2016–17 Serbian SuperLiga season. He collected 34 appearances in both domestic competitions until the end of same season.

IF Brommapojkarna
Petrić signed with IF Brommapojkarna in January 2018. He left the club again at the end of the year.

Career statistics

Personal life
Petrić married Tamara Pavlović, a football referee in the Serbian women Super Liga.

References

External links
 Nikola Petrić stats at utakmica.rs 
 
 
 
 

1991 births
Sportspeople from Čačak
Living people
Serbian footballers
Association football goalkeepers
FK Borac Čačak players
FK Mladost Lučani players
FK Čukarički players
IF Brommapojkarna players
Panachaiki F.C. players
FK Proleter Novi Sad players
FC Ararat-Armenia players
Serbian SuperLiga players
Serbian First League players
Allsvenskan players
Football League (Greece) players
Armenian Premier League players
Serbian expatriate footballers
Expatriate footballers in Sweden
Expatriate footballers in Greece
Expatriate footballers in Armenia
Serbian expatriate sportspeople in Sweden
Serbian expatriate sportspeople in Greece
Serbian expatriate sportspeople in Armenia